Morgan may refer to:

People and fictional characters
 Morgan (given name), including a list of people and fictional characters
 Morgan le Fay, a powerful witch in Arthurian legend
 Morgan (surname), a surname of Welsh origin
 Morgan (singer), Italian musician Marco Castoldi (born 1972)
 Moken, also spelled "Morgan", a seafaring ethnic group in the Andaman Sea

Places

United States
 Morgan, Georgia
 Morgan, Iowa
 Morgan, Minnesota
 Morgan, Missouri
 Morgan, Montana
 Morgan, New Jersey
 Morgan, Oregon
 Morgan, Pennsylvania
 Morgan, Texas
 Morgan, Utah
 Morgan, Vermont
 Morgan, West Virginia
 Morgan, Wisconsin, a town
 Morgan, Oconto County, Wisconsin, an unincorporated community
 Morgan, Shawano County, Wisconsin, an unincorporated community
 Morgan Mountain, Tehama County, California
 Mount Morgan (Inyo County, California)
 Mount Morgan (Mono County, California)
 Mount Morgan (Montana)
 Morgan Farm Area, Texas

Elsewhere
 Mount Morgan (Antarctica), Marie Byrd Land
 Morgan Peak, Palmer Land, Antarctica
 Morgan, South Australia, Australia, a town
 Mount Morgan (New South Wales), Australia, in the Snowy Mountains
 Morgan, Ontario, Canada, an unincorporated place and railway point

Animals
 Morgan (orca), a killer whale in poor health captured in June 2010 for rehabilitation
 Morgan horse, one of the earliest horse breeds developed in the United States

Arts and entertainment
 Morgan – A Suitable Case for Treatment, also called Morgan!, a 1966 comedy film
 Morgan (2012 film), an American drama
 Morgan (2016 film), an American science fiction thriller
 Morgan (band), an early 1970s band
 Morgan, a graphic novel by Hugo Pratt

In business
 Morgan (clothing brand), also called Morgan de Toi
 Morgan Motor Company, a British sports car manufacturer
 Morgan Stanley, an American multinational financial services corporation
 Morgan's, formerly a Canadian department store
 Morgan Advanced Materials, a British manufacturing company
 Morgans Hotel Group, boutique style hotel group
 Morgans Hotel, located on Madison Avenue, New York City
 CP Morgan, a defunct homebuilding company
 D. H. Morgan Manufacturing, a roller coaster manufacturer
 J.P. Morgan Chase & Co., American multinational banking and financial services holding company 
 Roy Morgan Research, an Australian company which produces the Morgan Poll

Science and technology
 Morgan (unit), a unit of recombinant frequency in genetics
 Duron 'Morgan', an alias used by a model of the AMD Duron processor

Other uses
 Charles W. Morgan (ship), a historical ship (whaler)
 Morgan F.C., an early twentieth century U.S. soccer team
 Morgan silver dollar, a U.S. coin minted from 1878 to 1921
 Morgan State University, Baltimore, Maryland, United States
 W. H. Morgan House, a historical house in Peabody, Kansas, United States
 Morgan station, Chicago, a former railway station, now a rapid transit station
 Morgan, an alternate spelling for morgen, a Welsh or Breton water spirit

See also
 Captain Morgan, a brand of rum
 De Morgan, a surname
 Fort Morgan (disambiguation)
 Morgaine
 Morgan City (disambiguation)
 Morgan County (disambiguation)
 Morgan Township (disambiguation)
 Morgana (disambiguation)
 Morgane (disambiguation)
 Morgen (disambiguation)